Sir Jonathon Espie Porritt, 2nd Baronet, CBE (born 6 July 1950) is a British environmentalist and writer. 
He is known for his advocacy of the Green Party of England and Wales. 
Porritt frequently contributes to magazines, newspapers and books, and appears on radio and television.

Early life
Jonathon Porritt was born in London, the son of Arthur Porritt, Baron Porritt, 11th Governor-General of New Zealand and his second wife, Kathleen Peck. Lord Porritt, who served as a senior officer in the Royal Army Medical Corps during World War II, was also the bronze medalist in the 1924 Summer Olympics "Chariots of Fire" 100 metres race. As well as receiving a life peerage, Lord Porritt had previously been awarded a baronetcy in 1963.  Jonathon Porritt therefore became the 2nd Baronet on Lord Porritt's death on 1 January 1994.

Porritt was educated at Wellesley House School, Broadstairs, Kent; Eton College; and Magdalen College, University of Oxford, where he earned a first class degree in modern languages.

Porritt started training as a barrister, but switched to teaching English at St Clement Danes Grammar School (later Burlington Danes School) in Shepherd's Bush, West London, in 1974. He taught there from 1974 to 1984, serving as Head of English from 1980 to 1984. In 1985 he married Sarah Staniforth CBE, daughter of Malcolm Arthur Staniforth.

Environmental and political involvement

The Green Party 
In the 1970s and early 1980s, Porritt was a prominent member of the Ecology Party (now the Green Party of England and Wales). Porritt served as chair of The Ecology Party from 1979 to 1980, and from 1982 to 1984. He presided over changes that made the party much more prominent in elections, himself standing as a parliamentary candidate in general elections in 1979 and 1983. 
In 1979 he received 4.1% of the vote in London Central, receiving attention from national media.
Under his stewardship, membership grew from a few hundred to around 3,000.

In 1984, Porritt published his first book, Seeing Green: Politics of Ecology Explained. It was written while he was policy director of the Ecology Party. As of 1999, it was still described as "the best general guide to the politics of ecology by an 'insider'". Reviewed nearly 30 years after its publication, it stands up as "prophetic in many respects", although somewhat off in the timing of its predictions, perhaps in part because Porritt did not anticipate the rise of indebtedness. Writing before the rise of the internet, Porritt even predicted the development of an "information-rich, knowledge-poor" age.

The Greens achieved 15% of the European Parliamentary vote in 1989, but were able to win only 1.2% of the vote in the 1992 general election, in which environmental issues were largely ignored. During this time Porritt became a strong public advocate of change in the Green Party. Along with Sara Parkin, he advocated for a more professional organisation with identifiable leaders, a change that was eventually approved.

In 1992 Porritt backed the election of Cynog Dafis who was elected to Parliament as the joint Plaid Cymru-Green MP for Ceredigion.
However, in 1994, the regional council of the Green Party suspended Porritt for supporting Dafis, and demanded that Dafis stop identifying himself as Green.

Between 1996 and 2009, Porritt largely withdrew from active party politics, concentrating instead on non-partisan and activist roles independent of the Green Party.

In March 2009, Porritt spoke at the launch of the South West Green Party European Election campaign in Bristol, stating that he had always remained a member of the Green Party and that it was the correct time to reaffirm his support. He noted that many of the policies in the Ecology Party's manifesto of 1979 were now accepted by mainstream political parties, and emphasized the importance of active support.

Prior to the 2015 general election, he was one of several public figures who endorsed the parliamentary candidacy of the Green Party's Caroline Lucas.

Friends of the Earth
In 1984 Porritt gave up teaching to become Director of Friends of the Earth in Britain, a post he held until 1990. 
Although criticized initially as inexperienced, in the long term he has been seen as an important factor in the group's success in the late 1980s.
He edited the Friends of the Earth Handbook (1987)
and encouraged Friends of the Earth to promote practical solutions in its local environmental campaigns, as well as thinking more globally and internationally. 
During his time as director, the membership of the organization expanded from 12,700 to 226,300.

Looking back in 2012, Porritt stated that becoming director of Friends of the Earth "was probably the best decision of my life." 
However, his affection for the organization has not stopped him from harshly criticizing it, as he did in 2015, when the group's top ten priority issues list did not include nuclear power.

Beyond Agenda 21
Porritt attended United Nations Conference on Environment and Development (UNCED) in Rio de Janeiro in 1992, eventually writing an introduction for The way forward : beyond Agenda 21 (1997).
From 1993–1996 he chaired Stakeholder Forum for a Sustainable Future, then known as United Nations Environment and Development UK (UNED UK).  The organization encourages international stakeholders to engage in decision-making for sustainable development.

Forum for the Future
With Sara Parkin and Paul Ekins, Porritt founded Forum for the Future in 1996, a sustainable development charity. 
 
The nonprofit offers advice on sustainability planning to multinational companies including Kellogg's and Unilever.

After founding Forum of the Future, Porritt largely withdrew from party politics to concentrate on non-partisan political work.

Sustainable Development Commission
In 2000 Porritt was appointed the inaugural Chair of the incoming Labour government's Sustainable Development Commission (SDC), set up by prime minister Tony Blair. He was reappointed twice for three-year terms, the last of which began 26 July 2006. From 2000 to 2009, Porritt chaired the SDC. 
He was, however, critical of the Labour government for its environmental record and its pro-nuclear stance, and has campaigned against nuclear power.

While at SDC, Porritt encouraged the work of economist Tim Jackson, whose SDC report Prosperity Without Growth was later published as a book under the same title. Since retiring from the SDC in September 2009, Porritt has publicly supported the report's analysis of economic growth as it relates to environmental and human well-being, and the potential for a sustainable economy.

The Sustainable Development Commission closed on 31 March 2011.

Population Matters
Porritt is a patron of the population concern charity Population Matters, (formerly known as the Optimum Population Trust). Porritt has stated that population growth is a serious threat to the global environment and that family planning, including both birth control and abortion, is a part of the answer to global warming. He recommends that people should have no more than two children.
 Porritt has asserted that "promotion of reproductive health is one of the most progressive forms of intervention" that could be used to reduce carbon emissions.

Porritt's views are based in part on a 2009 report by Thomas Wire at the London School of Economics, commissioned by Optimum Population Trust.  It compared the cost-effectiveness of access to family planning with other interventions such as low-carbon technologies, and concluded that access to family planning, by decreasing population and the subsequent human carbon footprint, could have a substantial impact on global warming.
Similar views are supported by other researchers and international organizations.

Porritt's remarks on the subject in 2009 caused outrage among anti-abortionists and some religious leaders. Porritt was also criticized for praising China for its 'one child family' policy, which has reduced birth rates but is described as coercive, cruel and causing "immeasurable suffering". Although the Green Party, Population Matters and other organizations assert that they only support voluntary use of family planning, calls for population control raise fears that it will be coercively used in ways that infringe human rights.
Porritt remained definite about his position. 

Environmental commentator George Monbiot, who also uses carbon emissions for ecological footprinting, has criticized Porritt's emphasis on family planning.  He asserts that radical family planning will have little impact unless people limit their consumption. "People might populate less as they become richer, but they do not consume less; rather they consume more. That is, as the habits of the super-rich show, there are no limits to human extravagance."  The carbon footprint of people in poorer countries has been shown to be much lower than that in wealthy countries.  Increasing availability to contraceptive usage in poor countries, although it may have decrease population growth in those countries, may therefore do little to limit carbon impact. Porritt argues that this does not lessen the responsibility of wealthy countries to address population, asserting that population affects both the rich and poor worlds, and that "Every country needs a population strategy, including the US and the UK."

Porritt is also an advisor to Project Drawdown, which "maps, measures, models, and describes the 100 most substantive solutions to global warming". Among the top ten solutions, according to Project Drawdown, are the education of women and the availability of family planning services.

Other activities
Porritt served as chairman of Sustainability South-West, the South-West Round Table for Sustainable Development in England, from 1999 to 2001, and later as president.

Porritt served as a trustee of the World Wildlife Fund (UK) from 1991–2005.
Porritt is on the advisory board of BBC Wildlife magazine and actively supports the efforts of experts promoting renewable energy and sustainable development such as Walt Patterson.

Porritt is an endorser of the Forests Now Declaration, presented at the United Nations Framework Convention on Climate Change (UNFCCC) meeting, held in Bali in December 2007. The Declaration calls for new market based carbon policies and reforms to prioritize the protection of tropical forests.  
Porritt has strongly criticized proposals by the UK government to sell off Britain's remaining 635,000 acres of public woodlands, 
and helped to form the organization Our Forests in 2012 to protect and expand public and private woodlands throughout England.

Porritt acts as advisor to many bodies on environmental matters, as well as to individuals including Prince Charles.

His best-selling book Capitalism: As if the World Matters was originally published in 2005, and revised and republished by Earthscan in September 2007. In it he argues that capitalism must be controlled and redirected to create a sustainable world.

In line with this view, Porritt has worked to encourage businesses to move towards sustainability.
As of 2004, Porritt became a Trustee of the Ashden Awards for Sustainable Energy. 
In 2005 he became a Non-Executive Director of  Wessex Water, 
and in 2008 he became a non-executive director for the Willmott Dixon Group.
Porritt also serves on the Sustainable Retail Advisory Board for Marks & Spencer,  advising the company on its long-term sustainability strategy.

Porritt is a convenor of the cross-party political movement, More United.

Porritt's book The World We Made (2013) is a futurist account of how the world will have changed by 2050, noted for both its comprehensiveness and optimism.

Honours and awards
In 2000, Jonathon Porritt was named a Commander of the Most Excellent Order of the British Empire (CBE).

Porritt became an honorary Doctor of Laws of the University of Sussex in 2000. 
Porritt received an Honorary Doctorate from Heriot-Watt University in 2001.
In July 2008, he became an honorary graduate of the University of Exeter.

On 9 February 2012 he became Chancellor of Keele University.

Arms

Bibliography

Books

Articles
 
Hilton, Isabel and Jonathon Porritt. "Sustainable development's 'taboo territory.'" chinadialogue. 2007-05-30.
 Perrement, Matt. "Interview with Jonathon Porritt: Sustainable development needs China." chinadialogue. 2006-09-19.
Porritt, Jonathon. "China could lead the fight for a cooler climate." chinadialogue.  2007-11-13.
 Porritt, Jonathon. "China: the most important story in the world." chinadialogue. 2006-09-18.

See also

 Forum for the Future
 Green Party of England and Wales
 Sustainable Development Commission
 Sustrans

References

External links

Biography
Sustainable Development Commission – profile of Jonathon Porritt.
Blog
Jonathon Porritt on population, 22 April 2013
Audio recording of 25 October 2007 talk at the RSA on Capitalism as if the world matters
Profile: Jonathon Porritt
Women.timesonline.co.uk
Jonathon Porritt RIBA Zero Carbon debate 2009(video)
The Burntwood Lecture 2010: The Growth Fetish and the Death of Environmentalism (video)
Economic Growth: Bane or Boon? Video of debate between Daniel Ben-Ami and Jonathon Porritt held at Northumbria University, October 2010
Ecology Party Political Broadcast from the 1983 General Election featuring Jonathon Porritt Green History archive video

1950 births
Living people
Alumni of Magdalen College, Oxford
British anti–nuclear power activists
Baronets in the Baronetage of the United Kingdom
Chancellors of Keele University
Commanders of the Order of the British Empire
English environmentalists
Green Party of England and Wales politicians
Green thinkers
People educated at Eton College
People from Cheltenham
Sustainability advocates
Wales Green Party politicians
Sons of life peers
English people of New Zealand descent